Guo Huaruo (1904−1995) was a Chinese military strategist and lieutenant general of the People's Liberation Army. According to Alastair Iain Johnston, Guo was until the mid-1980s "the CCP's most authoritative interpreter and annotator" of The Art of War by Sun Tzu, but Guo was "practically unknown in the West".

Johnson said 'Guo stressed that from a Marxist–Leninist perspective the notion of "not fighting and subduing the enemy"'—the core of the conventional interpretation of Sun Zi—was un-Marxist, since class enemies could not be credibly defeated without the application of violence.'

Around June 4, 1937, Guo was the dean of studies of Qingyang Infantry School.

Works
Guo wrote A Preliminary Study of Sun Tzu's Art of War (T: 孫子兵法初步研究, S: 孙子兵法初步研究, P: Sūnzǐ Bīngfǎ Chūbù Yánjiū), which was completed in 1939. It was used as a military textbook in areas controlled by Communists. The book says "The position Kuo has now enjoyed as a leading military theoretician seems to date from that period."

By 1971, Guo's latest edition of The Art of War was A Modern Translation with New Chapter Arrangement of Sun Tzu's ʻArt of Warʼ (T: 今譯新編孫子兵法, S: 今译新编孙子兵法, P: Jīnyì Xīn Biān Sūnzǐ Bīngfǎ). In this edition, Guo rearranged the material, used Simplified Chinese, and phrased Sun Tzu's verses in colloquial Chinese.

List of works
A Preliminary Study of Sun Tzu's Art of War (T: 孫子兵法初步研究, S: 孙子兵法初步研究, P: Sūnzǐ Bīngfǎ Chūbù Yánjiū)
A Modern Translation with New Chapter Arrangement of Sun Tzu's ʻArt of Warʼ  (T: 今譯新編孫子兵法, S: 今译新编孙子兵法, P: Jīnyì Xīn Biān Sūnzǐ Bīngfǎ)
Guo Huaruo's Selected Essays on Military Affairs (S: 郭化若军事论文选集, T: 郭化若軍事論文選集 Jūnshì Lùnwén Xuǎnjí). Liberation Army Press (Beijing), 1989.
Includes "Sun Zi yi zhu' qian yan," the preface to "Translation and Annotation of Sun Zi," 1983.

Notes

References
Johnston, Alastair Iain. "Cultural Realism and Strategy in Maoist China." Located in: Katzenstein, Peter J. (Contributor: Social Science Research Council (U.S.). Committee on International Peace & Security) The Culture of National Security: Norms and Identity in World Politics. Columbia University Press, 1996. pp. 216–268. , 9780231104692.
 Schram, Stuart R. Mao's Road to Power - Revolutionary Writings, 1912-1949: The Pre-Marxist Period, 1912-1920. M.E. Sharpe, April 1, 1997. , 9781563244575.
 Sun, Tzu (translation and introduction by Samuel B. Griffith, foreword by B.H. Liddell Hart). The Art of War. Oxford University Press, September 15, 1971. 56. , 9780195014761.

People's Republic of China politicians from Fujian
Chinese military writers
Military strategists
Writers from Fuzhou
Poets from Fujian
1904 births
1995 deaths
Chinese military personnel of World War II
People's Liberation Army generals from Fujian
Victims of the Cultural Revolution
Republic of China poets
People's Republic of China poets
Chinese Communist Party politicians from Fujian
Politicians from Fuzhou
Academic staff of the Counter-Japanese Military and Political University